José María Yermo Solaegui (21 June 1903 – 21 October 1960) was a Spanish athlete who participated in football, cycling and athletics during the 1920s and 1930s. He was born in Getxo.
 
He was first noted as an athlete and held the Spanish record for long jump and triple jump. At the 1923 edition of the Spanish Athletics Championships, he achieved a silver medal in the triple jump event, while he got silver in the 110 metres hurdles and bronze in the long jump and high jump in 1924, and silvers in high jump and triple jump in 1925. As an athlete he defended the colours of Arenas Club de Getxo, with whom he also played in the football team as a striker.

He played five times in the Spain national football team and participated in the 1928 Summer Olympics, scoring three goals in the first round match that Spain won against Mexico 7–1. He was also twice vice-champion of the Spanish Cup (Copa del Rey) with Arenas Club in 1925 and 1927. He retired from football in 1935.

Yermo was also a cyclist, participating in a World Championship and the Amsterdam Summer Olympic Games in 1928.

References

External links

Enciclopedia Auñamendi. José María Yermo

1903 births
1960 deaths
Spanish male cyclists
Spanish footballers
Cyclists at the 1928 Summer Olympics
Footballers at the 1928 Summer Olympics
Olympic cyclists of Spain
Olympic footballers of Spain
Footballers from Getxo
Arenas Club de Getxo footballers
Association football forwards
La Liga players
Cyclists from the Basque Country (autonomous community)
Spanish male long jumpers
Spanish male triple jumpers
Spain international footballers
Athletes from the Basque Country (autonomous community)